Jim Anderson (born April 20, 1937) is an American retired college basketball coach. He served as head men's basketball coach at Oregon State University from 1989 to 1995, compiling a record of 79–90. Anderson attended Oregon State as an undergrad, playing on teams that won three Far West Classic titles and a Pacific Coast Conference championship in 1958. In his senior season he was named to the Classic's all-tournament team. While at OSU he was a member of Phi Sigma Kappa fraternity. He graduated in 1959.

Anderson's debut as coach came in 1960, when he was named freshmen coach. He began his stint as assistant varsity coach in 1964, and when named Head Coach he was only the fourth to hold that title since 1929. 

During his long career, Anderson coached Beaver legends Brent Barry and Gary Payton. In his first season at Oregon State, he was named the Pac-10 Coach of the Year and led the Beavers to the 1990 NCAA Division I men's basketball tournament, the school's last NCAA Tournament appearance until 2015.

Head coaching record

References

1937 births
Living people
Oregon State Beavers men's basketball coaches
Oregon State Beavers men's basketball players
Basketball coaches from Oregon
American men's basketball players